Phosphopantetheine, also known as 4'-phosphopantetheine, is a prosthetic group of several acyl carrier proteins including the acyl carrier proteins (ACP) of fatty acid synthases, ACPs of polyketide synthases, the peptidyl carrier proteins (PCP), as well as aryl carrier proteins (ArCP) of nonribosomal peptide synthetases (NRPS). It is also present in formyltetrahydrofolate dehydrogenase.

Subsequent to the expression of the apo acyl carrier protein,  4'-phosphopantetheine moiety is attached to a serine residue. The coupling involves formation of a phosphodiester linkage. This coupling is mediated by acyl carrier protein synthase (ACPS), a 4'-phosphopantetheinyl transferase.

Phosphopantetheine prosthetic group covalently links to the acyl group via a high energy thioester bond. The flexibility and length of the phosphopantetheine chain (approximately 2 nm) allows the covalently tethered intermediates to access spatially distinct enzyme-active sites. This accessibility increases the effective molarity of the intermediate and allows an assembly line-like process.

See also
 Fatty acid synthase
 Pantothenic acid

References

Biomolecules
Metabolism
Thiols